Betty Natalie Boije af Gennäs (14 February 1822 - 14 November 1854), was a Finnish (originally Swedish) opera and concert singer (contralto) and composer.

She was one of eight children of the Swedish nobleman Klas Otto Boije af Gennäs and Marianna Horn af Rantzien, and the sister of the pianist Wilhelmina Boije. She was raised in Finland, were her father had a position at the customs office of Pori.

Betty Boije debuted as a concert singer in Turku in 1847. She was a student of the Swedish composer Isidor Dannström in 1847-48. She made a successful tour as a concert singer in Turku, Helsinki, Reval and Saint Petersburg. In 1849, she made her debut in Stockholm in Sweden. She was active as an opera singer at the Royal Swedish Opera in Stockholm in 1850-1851. She was described as an excellent alto  and was given particular praise as Nancy in Martha, in which she made such a success that she was made to act in it again and again. She herself chose to leave the stage and return her profession as a concert singer. She performed in Finland, Denmark and Norway.

She married Isidor Dannström in 1853. In 1853-54, she toured as a concert singer with her spouse and her sister in Great Britain and the United States. She made a success in London, where she performed with Louise Michaeli with her sister. In the United States, she performed in Washington and New York. After her performance in New York, however, she became ill, and they decided to discontinue the tour and return to Sweden. She died not long after their return.

She was also a composer.

Betty Boije was the first noblewoman to be professionally active as a stage performer in Finland and Sweden. The profession was not regarded to be suitable for a member of the aristocracy in this time period. Although Betty Boije's father was indeed a nobleman, he was not rich, and her sister also supported herself as an artist (in her case a pianist). Betty Boije's widower Isidor Dannström, in his late biography over her, claimed she had never acted on stage and merely performed as a concert singer.

References 

 Nordensvan, Georg (1918). Svensk teater och svenska skådespelare från Gustav III till våra dagar. Senare delen, 1842–1918. Stockholm: Bonnier.
 Dannström, Isidor in J. Leonard Höijer, Musik-Lexikon (1864).
 Dannström, Johan Isidor in Herman Hofberg, Svenskt biografiskt handlexikon (2:a upplagan, 1906).
 Ingeborg Nordin Hennel: Mod och Försakelse: Livs- och yrkesbetingelser för Konglig Theaterns skådespelerskor 1813-1863. Stockholm: Gidlunds (1997). .
 Isidor Dannström at Svenskt biografiskt lexikon.

1822 births
1854 deaths
19th-century classical composers
19th-century Swedish women opera singers
Operatic contraltos
Swedish classical composers
19th-century Swedish nobility
Women classical composers
Finnish people of Swedish descent
Swedish women composers
19th-century Swedish women musicians
19th-century women composers
19th-century Finnish nobility